St Mary's Mbeya Secondary School (SMMSS) is a school in Mbeya, Tanzania, located on the Tanzania-Zambia Highway.

It serves students from the Tanzania Southern Highlands, Dar Es Salaam, Morogoro, Arusha, and Iringa regions. Students also attend from Malawi and Zambia.

The school is a branch/campus of the St Mary's International Schools in Tanzania, founded by Hon. Rev. Dr. Gertrude Rwakatare, a senior bishop and co-founder (in 1995) of the Mikocheni Assemblies of God church at Mikocheni, Dar es Salaam.

Though founded in 2005 as a girls' boarding school, the school is now coeducational. Instruction is in English.

The school enrolls students in form one for a four-year course leading to the award of the Certificate of Secondary Education Examination (TZ). It has a wide variety of subjects with graduate teachers and also has well-stocked science and computer laboratories, manned by qualified personnel. Intakes are from November of every year at the premises.

See also

 Education in Tanzania
 List of schools in Tanzania

External links
  , the school's official website

2005 establishments in Tanzania
Assemblies of God schools
Boarding schools in Tanzania
Buildings and structures in the Mbeya Region
Christian schools in Africa
Co-educational boarding schools
Educational institutions established in 2005
Mbeya Region
Religious schools in Tanzania
Secondary schools in Tanzania